Bad Santa is a 2003 American Christmas black comedy crime film directed by Terry Zwigoff, written by Glenn Ficarra and John Requa, and starring Billy Bob Thornton in the title role, with a supporting cast of Tony Cox, Lauren Graham, Brett Kelly, Lauren Tom, John Ritter and Bernie Mac. It was Ritter's last live-action film appearance before his death on September 11, 2003; the film was dedicated to his memory. The Coen brothers are credited as executive producers. The film was released in the United States on November 26, 2003, and was screened out of competition at the 2004 Cannes Film Festival. It received positive reviews and was a commercial success.

An unrated version was released on DVD on March 5, 2004, and on Blu-ray on November 20, 2007, as Bad(der) Santa. A director's cut DVD was released in November 2006; it features Zwigoff's cut of the film (including an audio commentary with him and the film's editor), which is three minutes shorter than the theatrical cut and ten minutes shorter than the unrated version. A sequel, Bad Santa 2, was released on November 23, 2016, and failed to match the critical and commercial success of the original.

Plot

Willie T. Soke and his dwarf assistant Marcus Skidmore are professional thieves. Every year, Willie gets a job as a department store Santa Claus and Marcus as an elf to rob shopping malls Christmas eve night, with Marcus' wife Lois as their getaway driver. 

Marcus takes his job seriously, but Willie, a sex-addicted cursing alcoholic, is steadily unable to perform with children. When they are hired at the Saguaro Square Mall in Phoenix, Willie's vulgarity shocks the prudish mall manager Bob Chipeska, who brings them to the attention of security chief Gin Slagel.

At the mall, Willie is visited by Thurman Merman, a friendly but exceedingly gullible, dimwitted young boy who believes he really is Santa and is constantly bullied by a teenage gang of skateboarders. At a bar, Willie meets Sue, a bartender with a Santa Claus fetish, and they begin a sexual relationship. 

After having casual sex with Sue in his beaten-up Impala, Willie is harassed and attacked by a man he had encountered earlier at the bar, but Thurman intervenes. Willie gives the boy a ride home, where he lives with his senile grandmother. Thurman reveals that his mother died and his father, Roger, is "exploring mountains"—actually in jail for embezzlement. Willie tricks him into letting him rob their safe and take Roger's BMW 740iL (E38).

Bob overhears Willie having sex in a dressing room and sends Gin starts to investigate. After Willie sees his motel room being raided, he moves into Thurman's house, much to his delight. Marcus is angry at Willie for taking advantage of Thurman and disapproves of his sex addiction.

Gin visits Roger, who inadvertently reveals that Willie is staying with Thurman illegally. Confronting Willie and Marcus, he tells them he has uncovered their plan, blackmailing them for half the score to keep silent. Willie and Marcus’ partnership begins to falter, further exacerbated when Willie shows up to work drunk, destroying the Santa attraction.

Willie, about to commit suicide by inhaling vehicle exhaust fumes, gives Thurman a letter of confession for the police, including his misdeeds and the heist planned for Christmas Eve. However, he sees Thurman's black eye, and abandons the suicide attempt to confront the skateboarders; he assaults their leader, intimidating them to leave Thurman alone.

Furious at Gin's blackmail, Marcus and Lois set a trap for him. Feigning the need for a jump-start, Lois hits Gin with the car, and then kills him by crushing him between the vehicles. Willie and Thurman prepare for the approaching holiday with help from Sue. On Christmas Eve, Willie, Marcus, and Lois burglarize the mall. Although some technical difficulties arise, Willie successfully cracks the safe. Meanwhile, he also gets a pink stuffed elephant that Thurman wants for Christmas.  

However, Marcus reveals to Willie that he intends to kill him, fed up with his increasing carelessness. As he is about to execute Willie, the police unexpectedly swarm in, tipped off by Willie's letter he gave Thurman. A firefight ensues between Marcus and the cops while Willie flees. Determined to give Thurman his present, he leads the police on a chase to his house, ignoring their orders to freeze. He is shot repeatedly on Thurman's porch but survives.

The epilogue is told through a letter from a recovering Willie in the hospital. He expresses his gratitude to Thurman and reveals that he was cleared of the robbery— as the shooting of an unarmed Santa embarrassed the police—and will be working for them as a sensitivity counselor. Sue is granted guardianship over Thurman and his house until his father's release. Marcus and Lois are in prison; Willie ends the letter by hoping that Roger will avoid them and telling Thurman that he should be out of the hospital soon and to be ready for his return. 

When the lead skateboard bully harasses Thurman again, Thurman finally stands up to him by kicking him hard in the crotch and riding away on his bike, giving the downed bully the finger.

Cast

Production
In January 2002, Variety announced that Terry Zwigoff would be directing Bad Santa (his fourth picture and follow-up to Ghost World) under Dimension Films, with Glenn Ficarra and John Requa writing the screenplay and the Coen brothers serving as executive producers.

The Coens had developed the concept for Bad Santa, before eventually hiring the writing team of Ficarra and Requa to bring the story to life. The Coens told Ficarra and Requa that the story would center on an alcoholic "bad Santa" who seeks redemption very later on; additionally, they wanted it to be as funny as The Bad News Bears. Afterward, Ficarra and Requa completed what they described as a "really crass script", with the Coens adding "a bunch of crass jokes". When the script's final draft was sent to Universal Pictures, the studio rejected it because "[I]t was the foulest, disgusting, misogynistic, anti-Christmas, anti-children thing we could imagine," all of which influenced Bob Weinstein of Miramax to give it the green-light.

Casting
The Coens initially tailored roles for specific actors, such as James Gandolfini as Willie (since they had worked with him on The Man Who Wasn't There), Danny Woodburn as Marcus, and Angus T. Jones as Thurman.  Bill Murray, Jack Nicholson, and Robert De Niro were also considered for the role of Willie, but it eventually went to Billy Bob Thornton. Zwigoff cast Tony Cox for the role of Marcus and Brett Kelly for Thurman, which led to disagreements between himself and the producers. Upon learning of Cox's casting, the Coens told Weinstein that they "hate" him, and according to Zwigoff, Dimension was pining for "a more Disney-like generic cute kid" to play Thurman. "Maybe there are other actors who could do a great job with these parts. But Tony and Brett are just funny. They are these characters," explained Zwigoff.

Filming
The movie was filmed in various parts of California. Filming began on July 8, 2002, and ended in September 2002. The "Miami Beach" sequence at the beginning of the movie was filmed in Long Beach, while all of the scenes at Thurman's house were filmed in West Hills. All of the Saguaro Square Mall scenes were filmed entirely in the northeastern wing of Del Amo Fashion Center in Torrance, particularly in the former Montgomery Ward building, which was used for the mall's fictional anchor store, "Chamberlain's." The store and the entire wing were both vacant at the time of the movie's filming. The wing and building where the movie was filmed have since been demolished and replaced with the mall's new open-air lifestyle center.

Reception

Box office

The film grossed over $60 million domestically and more than $76 million in total worldwide.

Critical response

The site's critics consensus reads: "A gloriously rude and gleefully offensive comedy, Bad Santa isn't for everyone, but grinches will find it uproariously funny." On Metacritic, the film has a score of 70 out of 100, based on 38 critics, indicating "generally favorable reviews". Audiences polled by CinemaScore gave the film a "B" grade on an A+ to F scale.

An editorial in The Washington Times likened the movie to an "evil twin" of Miracle on 34th Street and chided The Walt Disney Company for allowing such a beloved figure as Santa Claus to be trashed by Miramax Films, then a Disney subsidiary.

Roger Ebert of the Chicago Sun-Times gave the film  stars out of four, writing how Bad Santa was a "demented, twisted [and] unreasonably funny work of comic kamikaze style".

Sequel

On October 29, 2015, it was announced that Billy Bob Thornton would return for Bad Santa 2, and that filming would begin in Montreal in January 2016 for a scheduled release of Christmas 2016. On November 3, 2015, it was announced that Mean Girls director Mark Waters would direct the film. On November 19, 2015, it was announced that Kathy Bates would join the cast as Willie's mother, and that Brett Kelly and Tony Cox would reprise their roles from the first film. On December 21, 2015, it was announced that Bad Santa 2 would be released on November 23, 2016. On January 6, 2016, Christina Hendricks joined the cast.

See also
 List of Christmas films

References

External links

 
 
 

2003 films
2003 comedy films
2003 black comedy films
2000s Christmas comedy films
2000s crime comedy films
2000s sex comedy films
American black comedy films
American Christmas comedy films
American crime comedy films
American sex comedy films
Columbia Pictures films
Miramax films
Dimension Films films
2000s English-language films
Films about alcoholism
Films about theft
Films about suicide
Films directed by Terry Zwigoff
Films scored by David Kitay
Films set in department stores
Films set in Florida
Films set in Miami
Films set in shopping malls
Films shot in California
2000s American films
Santa Claus in film